Abdul Raouf Khan is the Haqparsat Taluka City Nazim (Mayor) of Nawabshah. Raouf Khan is a member of Muttahida Qaumi Movement (MQM) of Pakistan.

Inclusion in MQM
Raouf Khan joined MQM in 1986 at the age of 17. He contested in the 1996’s National Assembly election from Nawabshah NA-166.

See also
 Quaid-e-Tahrik Altaf Hussain
 Sindh

References

External link
Rauf Khan

Muttahida Qaumi Movement politicians
Living people
1969 births
People from Shaheed Benazir Abad District
University of Karachi alumni